Chris O'Brien may refer to:

 Chris O'Brien (American football) (1881–1951), owner of the Chicago Cardinals and co-founder of the National Football League
 Chris O'Brien (baseball) (born 1989), minor league baseball player
 Chris O'Brien (rugby) (born 1950), Welsh rugby league player
 Chris O'Brien (surgeon) (1952–2009), Australian oncologist and surgeon
 Chris O'Brien (rugby union) (born 1964), United States rugby union player

See also
 Christopher O'Brien (disambiguation)